Primitive mammal can refer to:
monotremes
marsupials
sloths
armadillos